Lutz Dieter Schmadel (2 July 1942, in Berlin – 21 October 2016) was a German astronomer and a prolific discoverer of asteroids, who worked at the Astronomisches Rechen-Institut (ARI) of the University of Heidelberg.

His special interest was the astrometry of minor planets. Among his numerous discoveries were the three main-belt asteroids 8661 Ratzinger, 10114 Greifswald and 11508 Stolte.

He was the author of the Dictionary of Minor Planet Names, a reference book containing information about the discovery and naming of 12,804 asteroids (March 2006). One asteroid 2234 Schmadel, discovered in 1977, was named in his honor. The asteroid 8811 Waltherschmadel was named for his father, Walther Schmadel (1902–1944), who died at the Eastern Front near Stalingrad during WWII.

Discoveries 
Lutz Schmadel is credited by the Minor Planet Center with the discovery of 245 minor planets made between 1960 and 1993.

List of discovered minor planets

Works 
 Dictionary of Minor Planet Names, Google books
 Dictionary of minor planet names (5th Edition). Springer Verlag, Berlin/Heidelberg 2003, 
 Dictionary of minor planet names (Addendum to the 5th Edition: 2003-2005). Springer Verlag, Berlin/Heidelberg 2006, 
 Dictionary of minor planet names (Addendum to the 5th Edition: 2006-2008). Springer Verlag, Berlin/Heidelberg 2006, 
 Dictionary of minor planet names (6th Edition). Springer Verlag, Berlin/Heidelberg 2012,

References

External links 
 Asteroid 1992 RY "Sünkel" (German)
 Article on naming a star "Stolte" (Article with picture of Schmadel and Börngen) (German)
 Homepage of Lutz Schmadel

1942 births
2016 deaths
Discoverers of asteroids

20th-century German astronomers